The European Union (EU) has 24 official languages, of which threeEnglish, French and Germanhave the higher status of "procedural" languages of the European Commission (whereas the European Parliament accepts all official languages as working languages). Irish previously had the lower status of "treaty language" before being upgraded to an official and working language in 2007. However, a temporary derogation was enforced until 1 January 2022. The three procedural languages are those used in the day-to-day workings of the institutions of the EU. The designation of Irish as a "treaty language" meant that only the treaties of the European Union were translated into Irish, whereas Legal Acts of the European Union adopted under the treaties (like Directives and Regulations) did not have to be. Luxembourgish and Turkish, which have official status in Luxembourg and Cyprus, respectively, are the only two official languages of EU member states that are not official languages of the EU.

The EU asserts that it is in favour of linguistic diversity. This principle is enshrined in the EU Charter of fundamental rights (art. 22) and in the Treaty on European Union (art. 3(3) TEU).

In the EU, language policy is the responsibility of member states, and the EU does not have a common language policy; EU institutions play a supporting role in this field, based on the principle of "subsidiarity"; they promote a European dimension in the member states' language policies. The EU encourages all its citizens to be multilingual; specifically, it encourages them to be able to speak two languages in addition to their native language. Though the EU has very limited influence in this area, as the content of educational systems is the responsibility of individual member states, a number of EU funding programmes actively promote language learning and linguistic diversity.

The most widely understood language in the EU is English, which is understood by 44% of all adults, while German is the most widely used mother tongue, spoken by 18%. All 24 official languages of the EU are accepted as working languages, but in practice only threeEnglish, French, and Germanare in wide general use, and of these, English is the most commonly used. French is an official language in all three of the cities that are political centres of the Union: Brussels, Belgium; Strasbourg, France; and Luxembourg City, Luxembourg. Since the exit of the United Kingdom from the EU in 2020, the government of France has encouraged greater use of French as a working language.

Official EU languages

, the official languages of the European Union, as stipulated in the latest amendment of Regulation No 1 determining the languages to be used by the European Economic Community of 1958, are:

The number of member states exceeds the number of official languages, as several national languages are shared by two or more countries in the EU. Dutch, English, French, German, Greek, and Swedish are all official languages at the national level in multiple countries (see table above). In addition, Croatian, Czech, Danish, Hungarian, Italian, Slovak, and Slovene are official languages in multiple EU countries at the regional level.

Furthermore, not all national languages have been accorded the status of official EU languages. These include Luxembourgish, an official language of Luxembourg since 1984, and Turkish, an official language of Cyprus.

All languages of the EU are also working languages. Documents which a member state or a person subject to the jurisdiction of a member state sends to institutions of the Community may be drafted in any one of the official languages selected by the sender. The reply is drafted in the same language. Regulations and other documents of general application are drafted in the twenty-four official languages. The Official Journal of the European Union is published in the twenty-four official languages.

Documents of major public importance or interest are produced in all official languages, but that accounts for a minority of the institutions′ work. Other documents—e.g., communications with the national authorities, decisions addressed to particular individuals or entities and correspondence—are translated only into the languages needed. For internal purposes the EU institutions are allowed by law to choose their own language arrangements. The European Commission, for example, conducts its internal business in three languages, English, French, and German (sometimes called "procedural languages"), and goes fully multilingual only for public information and communication purposes. The European Parliament, on the other hand, has members who need working documents in their own languages, so its document flow is fully multilingual from the outset. Non-institutional EU bodies are not legally obliged to make language arrangement for all the 24 languages (Kik v. Office for Harmonization in the Internal Market, Case C-361/01, 2003 ECJ I-8283).

The translations are expensive. According to the EU's English-language website, the cost of maintaining the institutions’ policy of multilingualism—i.e., the cost of translation and interpretation—was €1,123 million in 2005, which is 1% of the annual general budget of the EU, or €2.28 per person per year. The EU Parliament has made clear that its member states have autonomy for language education, which by treaty the Union must respect.

Language families

The vast majority of EU languages belong to the Indo-European family: the three dominant subfamilies are the Germanic, Romance, and Slavic. Germanic languages are spoken in central and northern Europe and include Danish, Dutch, English, German, and Swedish. Romance languages are spoken in western and southern European regions; they include French, Italian, Portuguese, Romanian, and Spanish. The Slavic languages are to be found in central Europe and the Balkans in southern Europe. They include Bulgarian, Croatian, Czech, Polish, Slovak, and Slovene. The Baltic languages, Latvian and Lithuanian; the Celtic languages, including Irish; and Greek are also Indo-European.

Outside the Indo-European family, Estonian, Finnish, and Hungarian are Uralic languages while Maltese is the only Afroasiatic language with official status in the EU.

Writing systems

Most official EU languages are written in the Latin script. The two exceptions are Greek, which is written in the Greek script, and Bulgarian, which is written in Cyrillic script. With the accession of Bulgaria to the European Union on 1 January 2007, Cyrillic became the third official script of the European Union, following the Latin and Greek scripts. The current design of euro banknotes has the word euro written in both the Latin and Greek (Ευρώ) alphabets; the Cyrillic spelling (Eвро) was added to the new Europa series of banknotes started in 2013 (see Linguistic issues concerning the euro).

Language-specific regulations

Maltese
Although Maltese is an official language, the Council set a transitional period of three years from 1 May 2004, during which the institutions were not obliged to draft all acts in Maltese. It was agreed that the council could extend this transitional period by an additional year, but decided not to. All new acts of the institutions were required to be adopted and published in Maltese from 30 April 2007.

Irish 
When Ireland joined the EEC (now the EU) in 1973, Irish was accorded "Treaty Language" status. This meant that the founding EU Treaty was restated in Irish. Irish was also listed in that treaty and all subsequent EU treaties as one of the authentic languages of the treaties. As a Treaty Language, Irish was an official procedural language of the European Court of Justice. It was also possible to correspond in written Irish with the EU Institutions.

However, despite being the first official language of Ireland and having been accorded minority-language status in the Northern Ireland region of the United Kingdom, then an EU member state, Irish was not made an official working language of the EU until 1 January 2007. On that date an EU Council Regulation making Irish an official working language of the EU came into effect. This followed a unanimous decision on 13 June 2005 by EU foreign ministers that Irish would be made the 21st official language of the EU. However, a derogation previously stipulated that not all documents have to be translated into Irish as is the case with the other official languages.

The regulation meant that legislation adopted by both the European Parliament and the Council of Ministers is translated into Irish, and interpretation from Irish was available at European Parliament plenary sessions and some Council meetings. The cost of translation, interpretation, publication, and legal services involved in making Irish an official EU language was estimated at just under €3.5 million a year. On 3 December 2015, a new regulation passed by the council had set a definitive schedule on the gradual reduction of the derogation of the Irish language. This regulation outlined a schedule of gradual reduction spread across five years starting from 2016. The derogation was ultimately revoked on 1 January 2022, making Irish a fully recognised EU language for the first time in the state's history.

Irish is the only official language of the EU that is not the most widely spoken language in any member state. According to the 2006 Irish census figures, there are 1.66 million people in Ireland with some ability to speak Irish, out of a population of 4.6 million, though only 538,500 use Irish on a daily basis (counting those who use it mainly in the education system) and just over 72,000 use Irish as a daily language outside the education system.

South-Slavic languages
At the time of Croatia's accession to the EU, some diplomats and officials suggested that, rather than accepting Croatian as an official EU language, the EU should instead adopt a single hybrid language that would encompass several similar languages sometimes identified collectively as Serbo-Croatian; in addition to Croatian, this would include the Serbian, Bosnian, and Montenegrin languages, with the goal of reducing potential translation and interpretation costs if the other Western Balkan states eventually joined the EU as well. The International Criminal Tribunal for the former Yugoslavia was cited as an example of an international body that had conducted business in such a combined language. In negotiations with Croatia, however, it was agreed that Croatian would become a separate official EU language, as none of the other states at issue had yet been admitted to the EU.

Regional, minority and other languages
Some regional or minority languages spoken within the EU do not have official recognition at EU level. Some of them may have some official status within the member state and count many more speakers than some of the lesser-used official languages. The official languages of EU are in bold.

In the list, language varieties classified as dialects of an official language by member countries are not included. However, many of these varieties may be viewed as separate languages: for instance, Scots (the Germanic language descended from Old English, not the Celtic language known as Scottish Gaelic) and several Romance languages spoken in Spain, Portugal, France and Italy, such as Aragonese, Asturian, Mirandese, Lombard, Ligurian, Piedmontese, Venetian, Corsican, Neapolitan and Sicilian.

Languages of France

The French constitution stipulates French as the sole language of France. Since the 2008 modifications, article 75-1 of the Constitution adds that "regional languages form part of the French heritage".

Nevertheless, there exist a number of languages spoken by sizable minorities, such as Breton (a Celtic language), Basque, and several Romance languages such as Occitan, Catalan, Corsican and the various langues d'oïl (other than French), as well as Germanic languages spoken in Alsace-Lorraine (Central Franconian, High Franconian, Luxembourgish, and Alemannic) and French Flanders (Dutch).

These languages enjoy no official status under the French state, and regions are not permitted to bestow any such status themselves.

Languages of Greece

The official language of Greece is Greek, and recognized minority languages are Armenian, Ladino and Turkish. Nevertheless, there are several other languages in Greece, which lack any recognition. These are Albanian, Aromanian, Megleno-Romanian (these last two usually being collectively known as "Vlach"), Romani and the Slavic varieties spoken in the country. Greece has been described as the only European Union member state that sticks to a "linguistic assimilationist ideology".

Languages of Italy

Italy's official language is Italian, although twelve additional languages (namely Albanian, Catalan, German, Greek, Slovene, Croatian, French, Franco-Provençal, Friulian, Ladin, Occitan and Sardinian) have been recognized as minority languages by the 1999 national Framework Law on the Country's historical linguistic minorities, in accordance with the Article 6 of the Italian Constitution. However, many languages other than Italian and the above-mentioned twelve are spoken across the country, most of them being either Gallo-Italic or Italo-Dalmatian.

Languages of Spain

The Spanish governments have sought to give some official status in the EU for the languages of the autonomous communities of Spain, Catalan/Valencian, Galician and Basque. The 667th Council Meeting of the Council of the European Union in Luxembourg on 13 June 2005, decided to authorise limited use at EU level of languages recognised by member states other than the official working languages. The Council granted recognition to "languages other than the languages referred to in Council Regulation No 1/1958 whose status is recognised by the Constitution of a Member State on all or part of its territory or the use of which as a national language is authorised by law." The official use of such languages will be authorised on the basis of an administrative arrangement concluded between the council and the requesting member state.

Although Basque, Catalan/Valencian and Galician are not nationwide official languages in Spain, as co-official languages in the respective regions – pursuant to Spanish constitution, among other documents – they are eligible to benefit from official use in EU institutions under the terms of 13 June 2005 resolution of the Council of the European Union. The Spanish government has assented to the provisions in respect of these languages.

The status of Catalan, spoken by over 9 million EU citizens (just over 1.8% of the total), has been the subject of particular debate. On 11 December 1990, the use of Catalan was the subject of a European Parliament Resolution (resolution A3-169/90 on languages in the [European] Community and the situation of Catalan).

On 16 November 2005, the President Peter Straub of the Committee of the Regions signed an agreement with the Spanish Ambassador to the EU, approving the use of Spanish regional languages in an EU institution for the first time in a meeting on that day, with interpretation provided by European Commission interpreters.

On 3 July 2006, the European Parliament's Bureau approved a proposal by the Spanish State to allow citizens to address the European Parliament in Basque, Catalan/Valencian and Galician, two months after its initial rejection.

On 30 November 2006, the European Ombudsman, Nikiforos Diamandouros, and the Spanish ambassador in the EU, Carlos Bastarreche, signed an agreement in Brussels to allow Spanish citizens to address complaints to the European Ombudsman in Basque, Catalan/Valencian and Galician, all three co-official languages in Spain. According to the agreement, a translation body, which will be set up and financed by the Spanish government, will be responsible for translating complaints submitted in these languages. In turn, it will translate the Ombudsman's decisions from Spanish into the language of the complainant. Until such a body is established the agreement will not become effective.

Galician in particular, not being itself a European Parliament official language, can be used and is in fact used by some European Parliament constituents as a spoken dialect of Portuguese due to its similarity with this language.

Luxembourgish and Turkish
Luxembourgish (Luxembourg) and Turkish (Cyprus) are the only two national languages that are not official languages of the EU. Neither Luxembourg nor Cyprus have yet used the provision of 13 June 2005 resolution to benefit from use in official EU institutions. On 26 February 2016 it was made public that Cyprus has asked to make Turkish an official EU language, in a “gesture” that could help reunification and improve EU–Turkey relations. Already in 2004, it was planned that Turkish would become an official language if Cyprus reunited. Turkish is also a recognized minority language in three EU member countries (Croatia, Greece and Romania). 

In September 2010, Luxembourg's foreign minister Jean Asselborn declined a request of the Alternative Democratic Reform Party (ADR) to make Luxembourgish an official language of the European Union citing financial reasons and also that German and French being already official languages would be sufficient for the needs of Luxembourg.

Romani
The Romani people, numbering over two million in the EU, speak the Romani language (actually numerous different languages), which is not official in any EU member state or polity, except for being an official minority language of Sweden and Finland. Moreover, Romani mass media and educational institution presences are near-negligible.

Russian
Though not an official language of the European Union, Russian is spoken in all member states that were part of the Soviet Union (and before that the Russian Empire). Russian is the native language of about 1.6 million Baltic Russians residing in Estonia, Latvia, and Lithuania, as well as a sizeable community of about 3.5 million in Germany and as a major immigrant language elsewhere in the EU, e.g. in and around Paris. Russian is also understood by a majority of ethnic Estonians, Latvians, and Lithuanians born before c. 1980, since, as official language of the Soviet Union, it was a compulsory school subject in those countries that were part of the Soviet Union. To a lesser extent, this legacy also holds true among the older generation in parts of the EU that were formerly part of the Eastern bloc, such as the GDR.

In March 2010 fact-sheets in Russian produced by the EU executive's offices in Latvia were withdrawn, provoking criticism from Plaid Cymru MEP and European Free Alliance group President Jill Evans who called European Commission to continue to provide information in non-official EU languages and commented that "it's disappointing to hear that the EU is bowing to pressure to exclude Russian speakers in the Baltic in this way".

Sami languages 
In Finland, the Sami languages Northern Sami (ca. 2,000 speakers), Skolt Sami (400) and Inari Sami (300) have limited local recognition in certain municipalities of Finnish Lapland. Furthermore, legislation specifically concerning the Sami must be translated to these languages. Bilingualism with Finnish is universal, though.

At least five different Sami languages are spoken in Sweden, but "Sami language" (undifferentiated) is recognised as an official minority language in Sweden, and is co-official with Swedish in four municipalities in Norrbotten County (Swedish Lapland). Most of Sami speakers speak Northern Sami (5,000–6,000 speakers), although there are ca. 1,000–2,000 Lule Sami speakers and 600 Southern Sami speakers. Also Ume Sámi and Pite Sámi are spoken in Sweden.

Latin
For millennia, Latin served as a lingua franca for administrative, scholarly, religious, political, and other purposes in parts of the present-day European Union. After Athens and other Greek city-states of the 6th to 4th centuries BC, the first documented political entity historically verifiable in Europe was the Roman Republic, traditionally founded in 509 BC, the successor-state to the Etruscan city-state confederacies.
Latin as a lingua franca of Europe was rivalled only by Greek. It is serving as honourable and ceremonial language in some of the oldest European universities in the 21st century, and has operated as the official language of the Roman Catholic Church until today. Latin, along with Greek, was at the core of education in Europe from the schools of rhetoric of the Roman Republic in all of its provinces and territories, through the medieval trivium and quadrivium, through the humanists and the Renaissance, all the way to Newton's Principia Mathematica Philosophiae Naturalis (just to name one example of thousands of scientific works written in this language), to the public schools of all European countries, where Latin (along with Greek) was at the core of their curricula. Latin served as the undisputed European lingua franca until the 19th century, when the cultures of vernacular languages and the "national languages" started to gain ground and claim status. Today, several institutions of the European Union use Latin in their logos and domain names instead of listing their names in all the official languages. For example, the European Court of Justice has its website at "curia.europa.eu". The Court of Auditors uses Curia Rationum in its logo. The Council of the European Union has its website at http://www.consilium.europa.eu/ and its logo showing Consilium. The European Union itself has a Latin motto: "In varietate concordia". Under the European Company Regulation, companies can be incorporated as Societas Europaea (Latin for "European Company", often shortened to "SE" after the company's own proper name). Latin is one of the languages of IATE (the inter-institutional terminology database of the European Union).

Immigrant languages
A wide variety of languages from other parts of the world are spoken by immigrant communities in EU countries. Turkish (which is also an official language of the EU member Cyprus) is spoken as a first language by an estimated 1% of the population in Belgium and the western part of Germany, and by 1% in the Netherlands. Other widely used migrant languages include Berber languages which are spoken by about 1% of the population of both the Netherlands and Belgium and by many Berber migrants in France, Spain, Italy and Germany. Arabic is spoken in many EU countries mainly in its Maghrebi and Levantine varieties. Maghrebi Arabic is spoken by migrants in France, Italy, Spain, the Netherlands, Belgium and Germany. Levantine Arabic is spoken by migrants in Germany, France, Sweden, Denmark, Austria and Greece. Languages from former Yugoslavia (Serbian, Bosnian, Macedonian, Albanian, etc.) are spoken in many parts of the EU by migrants and refugees who have left the region as a result of the Yugoslav wars and unrest there.

There are large Chinese communities in France, Spain, Italy, and other countries. Some countries have Chinatowns. Old and recent Chinese migrants speak a number of Chinese varieties, in particular Cantonese and other southern Chinese varieties. However, Mandarin is becoming increasingly more prevalent due to the opening of the People's Republic of China.

There are many Russian-speaking immigrants in Germany and France.

Many immigrant communities in the EU have been in place for several generations now, and their members are bilingual, at ease both in the local language and in that of their community.

Sign languages

A wide variety of sign languages are used in the EU, with around 500,000 people using a sign language as their first language. None of these languages are recognised as an official language of an EU member state, with the exception of Ireland passing the Irish Sign Language Act 2017 that granted it official status alongside Irish and English, and only two states (Finland and Portugal) refer to sign languages in their constitution.

Several NGOs exist which support signers, such as the European Union of the Deaf and the European Sign Language Centre. The European Commission has also supported some initiatives to produce digital technologies that can better support signers, such as Dicta-Sign and SignSpeak.

The sign languages in use in the EU are more difficult to classify into language families than the spoken languages, because of language contact and creolization. Important families include the Swedish, French, and German sign language families.

Vietnamese

Vietnamese is one of the 14 recognized minority languages in the Czech Republic.

Esperanto
Esperanto is a constructed language that is part of the educational system in several member states. In Hungary it is officially recognised by the Ministry of Education as a foreign language; and examinations in Esperanto may be used to meet the requirements of knowledge of foreign languages needed to complete university or high school. Every year, since 2001, between 1000 and 3000 people have passed examinations in Esperanto, making up for a sum of more than 35,000 up to 2016; it is recognised by the Hungarian state. The Hungarian census 2001 found 4575 Esperanto speakers in Hungary (4407 of them learned the language, for 168 of them it is a family or native language); in 2011 it found 8397 Esperanto speakers. In 1990 there were only 2083 Esperanto speakers in Hungary following the census.

Esperanto is not mentioned by the EU Commission as an EU language; the Commission mentions only official, indigenous regional and minority languages as well as languages of immigrants. Following estimates there are approximately 100,000 Europeans sometimes using Esperanto (and several millions having learned Esperanto); the language has several thousand native speakers, some of them of the second or third generation.

The European party Europe – Democracy – Esperanto seeks to establish the planned language as an official second language in the EU in order to make international communication more efficient and fair in economical and philosophical terms. They are based on the conclusions of the Grin Report, which concluded that it would hypothetically allow savings to the EU of €25 billion a year (€54 for every citizen) and have other benefits. However, the EU Parliament has stated clearly that language education is the responsibility of member states.

The European Esperanto Union also promotes Esperanto as the international auxiliary language of Europe.

Knowledge

The five most spoken languages in the EU are English (44%), German (36%), French (30%), Italian (18%) and Spanish (17%). At 20% of the total number of speakers, German is the most widely spoken native language, followed by Italian (15%), French (14%) and Spanish (9%). The knowledge of foreign languages varies considerably in the specific countries, as the table below shows. The most spoken second or foreign languages in the EU are English, French, German, Spanish, and Russian. In the table, boxes coloured light blue mean that the language is an official language of the country, while the main language spoken in the country is coloured dark blue.

1 This does not refer to the total population of the countries.2 40% of those who speak French are native speakers, for a total of 85%.3 Includes about 30% native speakers4 Includes more than 30% native speakers

A total of 56% of citizens in the EU member states are able to hold a conversation in one language apart from their native language. This is nine points higher than reported in 2001 among the 15 member states at the time. A total of 28% of the respondents state that they speak two foreign languages well enough to have a conversation. Almost half of the respondents—44%—do not know any other language than their native language. Approximately 1 in 5 Europeans can be described as an active language learner (i.e., someone who has recently improved his/her language skills or intends to do so over the following 12 months).

English remains by far the most widely spoken foreign language throughout Europe. A total of 95% of students in the EU study English at secondary level and 38% of EU citizens state that they have sufficient skills in English to have a conversation (excluding citizens of Ireland, an English-speaking country). A total of 28% of Europeans indicate that they know either French (14%) or German (14%), along with their native language. French is most commonly studied and used in southern Europe, especially in Mediterranean countries, in Germany, Portugal, Romania, the Benelux countries and Ireland. German, on the other hand, is commonly studied and used in the Benelux countries, in Scandinavia, and in the newer EU member states. Spanish is most commonly studied in France, Italy, Luxembourg, and Portugal. In 19 out of 29 countries polled, English is the most widely known language apart from the native language, this being particularly the case in Sweden (89%), Malta (88%); the Netherlands (87%); and Denmark (86%). A total of 77% of EU citizens believe that children should learn English. English was considered the number one language to learn in all countries where the research was conducted except for Ireland and Luxembourg. English, either as a native language or as a second/foreign language, is spoken by 44% of EU citizens, followed by German with 36% and French with 30%.

With the enlargement of the European Union, the balance between French and German is slowly changing. More citizens in the new member states speak German (23% compared with 12% in the EU15) while fewer speak French or Spanish (3% and 1% respectively compared with 16% and 7% among the EU15 group). A notable exception is Romania, where 24% of the population speaks French as a foreign language compared to 6% who speak German as a foreign language. At the same time, the balance is being changed in the opposite direction by growth of the French-speaking population and decrease of the German-speaking population.

Language skills are unevenly distributed both over the geographical area of Europe and over sociodemographic groups. Reasonably good language competences are perceived in relatively small member states with several state languages, lesser used native languages or "language exchange" with neighbouring countries. This is the case in Luxembourg, where 92% speak at least two languages. Those who live in southern European countries or countries where one of the major European languages is a state language have a lower likelihood of speaking multiple foreign languages. Only 5% of Turks, 13% of Irish, 16% of Italians, 17% of Spaniards and 18% of Britons speak at least two languages apart from their native language.

Working languages

European Commission 
While documents for and communication with citizens are in every official EU language as a right, day-to-day work in the European Commission is based around its three working languages: English, French, and German. Of these, English and French are used the most often. The use of English vs. French depends greatly on the unit or directorate. Only a few of the commissioners use a language other than English or French as their working language. German is rarely used as a true working language in the Commission, and German media have called the dominance of English and French a discrimination against German (which is the most spoken mother tongue of the EU) and a violation of the regulations pertaining to the EU's working languages. The German Bundestag has repeatedly called for German to receive an equal position in the Commission alongside English and French. The language situation has also disappointed many in France, and Kristalina Georgieva, who is from Bulgaria, gained a round of applause when she told the European Parliament she would learn French while in the Commission.

Use of German has, however, been increasing in EU institutions, as has the number of people learning the language across Europe.

European Parliament 

The European Parliament translates its proceedings into all official languages so that fellow MEPs can understand them better than if they had the delayed translation. Committee meetings also often default to the language most understood by those attending instead of listening to the translation.

Court of Justice 

The working language of the Court of Justice of the European Union is French. The judges deliberate in French, pleadings and written legal submissions are translated into French, and the judgment is drafted in French. The Advocates-General, by contrast, may work and draft their opinions in any official language, as they do not take part in any deliberations. These opinions are then translated into French for the benefit of the judges and their deliberations.

European Central Bank 

The working language of the European Central Bank is English.

Policy 
The European Union's legal powers on legislative acts and other initiatives on language policy are based on the provisions of the Treaties of the European Union. In the EU, language policy is the responsibility of member states, and the European Union does not have a common "language policy". Based on the principle of subsidiarity, European Union institutions play a supporting role in this field, promoting cooperation between the member states and promoting the European dimension in the member states' language policies, particularly through the teaching and dissemination of the languages of the member states (Article 149.2). The rules governing the languages of the institutions of the Community shall, without prejudice to the provisions contained in the Statute of the Court of Justice, be determined by the council, acting unanimously (Article 290). All languages, in which was originally drawn up or was translated due to enlargement, are legally equally authentic. Every citizen of the Union may write to any of the EU institutions or bodies in one of these languages and receive an answer in the same language (Article 314).

In the Charter of Fundamental Rights, legally binding since its inclusion in the Lisbon Treaty, the EU declares that it respects linguistic diversity (Article 22) and prohibits discrimination on grounds of language (Article 21). Respect for linguistic diversity is a fundamental value of the European Union, in the same way as respect for the person, openness towards other cultures, and tolerance and acceptance of other people.

Initiatives

Through strategic studies, the Commission promotes debate, innovation, and the exchange of good practice. In addition, the mainstream actions of Community programmes which encourage mobility and transnational partnerships motivate participants to learn languages.

Youth exchanges, town twinning projects, and the European Voluntary Service also promote multilingualism. Since 1997, the Culture 2000 programme has financed the translation of around 2,000 literary works from and into European languages.

The new programmes proposed for implementation for the financial perspective 2007–2013 (Culture 2007, Youth in Action, and Lifelong Learning) will continue and develop this kind of support.

The EU used to provide the main financial support to the European Bureau for Lesser-Used Languages until 2010, a non-governmental organisation which represents the interests of the over 40 million citizens who belong to a regional and minority language community, and for the Mercator networks of universities active in research on lesser-used languages in Europe. Following a request from the European Parliament, the commission in 2004 launched a feasibility study on the possible creation of a new EU agency, the "European Agency for Language Learning and Linguistic Diversity." The study concludes that there are unmet needs in this field, and proposes two options: creating an agency or setting up a European network of "Language Diversity Centres." The Commission believes that a network would be the most appropriate next step and, where possible, should build on existing structures; it will examine the possibility of financing it on a multi-annual basis through the proposed Lifelong Learning programme. Another interesting step would be to translate important public websites, such as the one of the European Central Bank, or Frontex web site also, in at least one other language than English or French.

Although not an EU treaty, most EU member states have ratified the European Charter for Regional or Minority Languages.

To encourage language learning, the EU supported the Council of Europe initiatives for European Year of Languages 2001 and the annual celebration of European Day of Languages on 26 September.

To encourage the member states to cooperate and to disseminate best practice the Commission issued a Communication on 24 July 2003, on Promoting Language Learning and Linguistic Diversity: an Action Plan 2004–2006 and a Communication on 22 November 2005, on A New Framework Strategy for Multilingualism.

From 22 November 2004, the European Commissioner for Education and Culture portfolio included an explicit reference to languages and became European Commissioner for Education, Training, Culture and Multilingualism with Ján Figeľ at the post. From 2007 until 2010, the European Commission had a special portfolio on languages, European Commissioner for Multilingualism. The post was held by Leonard Orban. Since 2010, the portfolio was merged with education and culture, again.

EU devotes a specialised subsite of its "Europa" portal to languages, the EUROPA Languages portal.

See also

 Languages of Europe
 English language in Europe
 French language in Europe
 German language in Europe
 European Day of Languages 26 September
 Languages of the African Union
 Linguistic issues concerning the euro
 Translation Centre for the Bodies of the European Union (CDT) – Inter-Active Terminology for Europe (IATE)

References

Further reading

 Hogan-Brun, Gabrielle and Stefan Wolff. 2003. Minority Languages in Europe: Frameworks, Status, Prospects. Palgrave. 
 Nic Craith, Máiréad. 2005. Europe and the Politics of Language: Citizens, Migrants and Outsiders. Palgrave. 
 Richard L. Creech, "Law and Language in the European Union: The Paradox of a Babel ‘United in Diversity’" (Europa Law Publishing: Groningen, 2005) 
 Shetter, William Z., EU Language Year 2001: Celebrating diversity but with a hangover, Language Miniature No 63.
 Shetter, William Z., Harmony or Cacophony: The Global Language System, Language Miniature No 96.
 Van der Jeught, Stefaan (2015). EU Language Law, Groningen: Europa Law Publishing, .

External links

 Europa: Languages and Europe – The European Union portal on languages
 Eurostat: Foreign language learning statistics (Jan. 2016)
 European Commission > Education and Training > Policy Areas > Languages
 European Commission Directorate-General for Translation (DGT)
 European Commission Directorate-General for Interpretation (former SCIC)
 European Union Publications Office
 European Union interinstitutional style guide
 Translation tools and workflow
 Most Europeans can speak multiple languages. UK and Ireland not so much
 Key Data on Teaching Languages at School in Europe - 2012 Edition

 
European Union-related lists
Europe

hr:Jezici Europske unije